The 2020 Vermont House of Representatives elections took place as part of the biennial United States elections. Vermont voters elected all 150 state representatives from 104 districts, with each district electing between one and two representatives. State representatives serve two-year terms in the Vermont House of Representatives. A primary election on August 11, 2020, determined which candidates appeared on the November 3 general election ballot. All the members elected will serve in the Vermont General Assembly.

Summary of results

Source:

Retiring incumbents
19 incumbent Representatives (13 Democrats, 3 Republicans and 3 Progressives) did not seek reelection in 2020.

Bennington 2-1: Chris Bates (D)
Caledonia-Washington: Kitty Toll (D)
Chittenden 1: Marcia Gardner (D)
Chittenden 2: Terence Macaig (D)
Chittenden 6-5: Johannah Leddy Donovan (D)
Chittenden 6-5: Mary Sullivan (D)
Chittenden 6-7: Diana Gonzalez (P)
Chittenden 8-1: Linda K. Myers (R)
Chittenden 8-2: Dylan Giambatista (D)
Essex-Caledonia: Connie Quimby (R)
Franklin 4: Marianna Gamache (R)
Lamoille 2: Matthew Hill (D)
Orange-Caledonia: Chip Conquest (D)
Orleans-Caledonia: Sam Young (D)
Windham 4: Nader Hashim (D)
Windsor 1: Zachariah Ralph (P)
Windsor 2: Annmarie Christensen (D)
Windsor 4-1: Randall Szott (D)
Windsor-Rutland: Sandy Haas (P)

Defeated incumbents

In the primary
Two incumbent representatives (both Democrats) sought reelection but were defeated in the August 11 primary.
Chittenden 6-2: Jean O'Sullivan (D)
Windham 3: Kelley Tully (D)

In the general election
Eight incumbent representatives (5 Democrats, 1 Republican, 1 Progressive and 1 Independent) sought reelection but were defeated in the November 3 general election
Bennington 4: Cynthia Browning (D) (sought reelection as an independent)
Chittenden 8-3: Robert Bancroft (R)
Franklin 4: Charen Fegard (D)
Grand Isle-Chittenden: Mitzi Johnson (D)
Orange 1: Carl Demrow (D)
Orange-Washington-Addison: Peter Reed (I)
Rutland-Bennington: Robin Chesnut-Tangerman (P)
Rutland 2: Dave Potter (D)

Predictions

Detailed results

Source for all election results:

Addison 1 
Elects two representatives.

Addison 2 
Elects one representative.

Addison 3 
Elects two representatives.

Addison 4 
Elects two representatives.

Addison 5 
Elects one representative.

Addison-Rutland 
Elects one representative.

Bennington 1 
Elects one representative.

Bennington 2-1 
Elects two representatives.
Democratic primary

General election

Bennington 2-2 
Elects two representatives.

Bennington 3 
Elects one representative.
Republican primary

General election

Bennington 4 
Elects two representatives.
Democratic primary

General election

Bennington-Rutland 
Elects two representatives.

Caledonia 1 
Elects one representative.

Caledonia 2 
Elects one representative.

Caledonia 3 
Elects two representatives.

Caledonia 4 
Elects two representatives.

Caledonia-Washington 
Elects one representative.
Democratic primary

General election

Chittenden 1 
Elects one representative.

Chittenden 2 
Elects two representatives.

Chittenden 3 
Elects two representatives.

Chittenden 4-1 
Elects one representative.

Chittenden 4-2 
Elects one representative.
Democratic primary

 
Republican primary

General election

Chittenden 5-1 
Elects one representative.

Chittenden 5-2 
Elects one representative.

Chittenden 6-1 
Elects two representatives.

Chittenden 6-2 
Elects one representative.
Democratic primary

 
General election

Chittenden 6-3 
Elects two representatives.

Chittenden 6-4 
Elects two representatives.

Chittenden 6-5 
Elects two representative.
Democratic primary

General election

Chittenden 6-6 
Elects one representative.

Chittenden 6-7 
Elects two representatives.
Democratic primary

General election

Chittenden 7-1 
Elects one representative.

Chittenden 7-2 
Elects one representative.

Chittenden 7-3 
Elects one representative.

Chittenden 7-4 
Elects one representative.

Chittenden 8-1 
Elects two representatives.
Democratic primary

General election

Chittenden 8-2 
Elects two representatives.
Democratic primary

General election

Chittenden 8-3 
Elects one representative.

Chittenden 9-1 
Elects two representatives.

Chittenden 9-2 
Elects two representatives.
Republican primary

General election

Chittenden 10 
Elects two representatives.

Essex-Caledonia 
Elects two representatives.

Essex-Caledonia-Orleans 
Elects two representatives.

Franklin 1 
Republican primary

General election

Franklin 2 
Elects one representatives.

Franklin 3-1 
Elects two representatives.

Franklin 3-2 
Elects one representative.

Franklin 4 
Elects two representatives.

Franklin 5 
Elects two representatives.

Franklin 6 
Elects one representative.

Franklin 7 
Elects one representative.

Grand Isle-Chittenden 
Elects two representatives.

Lamoille 1 
Elects one representative.

Lamoille 2 
Elects two representatives.

Lamoille 3 
Elects one representative.

Lamoille-Washington 
Elects two representatives.

Orange 1 
Elects two representatives.
Democratic primary

Republican primary

General election

Orange 2 
Elects one representative.

Orange-Caledonia 
Elects one representative.

Orange-Washington-Addison 
Elects two representatives.

Orleans 1 
Elects two representatives.

Orleans 2 
Elects two representatives.

Orleans-Caledonia 
Elects two representatives.
Republican primary

General election

Orleans-Lamoille 
Elects one representative.

Rutland-Bennington 
Elects one representative.

Rutland 1 
Elects one representative.

Rutland 2 
Elects two representatives.

Rutland 3 
Elects one representative.

Rutland 4 
Elects one representative.

Rutland 5-1 
Elects one representative.

Rutland 5-2 
Elects one representative.

Rutland 5-3 
Elects one representative.

Rutland 5-4 
Elects one representative.

Rutland 6 
Elects two representatives.

Rutland-Windsor 1 
Elects one representative.

Rutland-Windsor 2 
Elects one representative.

Washington 1 
Elects two representatives.
Democratic primary

General election

Washington 2 
Elects two representatives.

Washington 3 
Elects two representatives.

Washington 4 
Elects one representative.

Washington 5 
Elects one representative.

Washington 6 
Elects one representative.

Washington 7 
Elects one representative.

Washington-Chittenden 
Elects one representative.

Windham 1 
Elects one representative.

Windham 2-1 
Elects one representative.

Windham 2-2 
Elects one representative.

Windham 2-3 
Elects one representative.

Windham 3 
Elects two representatives.
Democratic primary

General election

Windham 4 
Elects two representatives.
Democratic primary

General election

Windham 5 
Elects one representative.

Windham 6 
Elects one representative.

Windham-Bennington 
Elects one representative.

Windham-Bennington-Windsor 
Elects one representative.

Windsor 1 
Elects two representatives.
Democratic primary

General election

Windsor 2 
Elects one representative.
Democratic primary

General election
Democratic nominee Daniel Boyer withdrew before the general election and was replaced by John Arrison.

Windsor 3-1 
Elects one representative.

Windsor 3-2 
Elects two representatives.

Windsor 4-1 
Elects one representative.
Democratic primary

General election

Windsor 4-2 
Elects two representatives.

Windsor 5 
Elects one representative.

Windsor-Orange 1 
Elects one representative.

Windsor-Orange 2 
Elects two representatives.

Windsor-Rutland 
Elects one representative.
Democratic primary

General election

See also
 2020 Vermont elections
2020 United States elections
2020 United States House of Representatives election in Vermont
2020 Vermont gubernatorial election
2020 Vermont elections

Notes

References

House
Vermont House
Vermont House of Representatives elections